Abilene is a small unincorporated community farming community in Charlotte County, Virginia, United States.  It is centered on the local convenience store Abilene Junction, formerly known as Abilene Grocery.  Located on the Norfolk Southern Railroad line, Abilene Junction was once a popular stop for tourists riding the train, providing them with refreshments, hot meals, and Southern hospitality.  Currently, Abilene consists of numerous small farms, producing mainly tobacco, hay, and beef.  One of the last wooden bridges left in Charlotte County existed in Abilene until late 2009, when a stray fire burnt it to the point that it was structurally unsound.  It was later removed by the railroad, and there are currently no plans to replace it.

Unincorporated communities in Charlotte County, Virginia
Unincorporated communities in Virginia